(also 2020CD3 or CD3 for short) is a tiny near-Earth asteroid (or minimoon) that ordinarily orbits the Sun but makes close approaches to the Earth–Moon system, in which it can temporarily enter Earth orbit through temporary satellite capture (TSC). It was discovered at the Mount Lemmon Observatory by astronomers Theodore Pruyne and Kacper Wierzchoś on 15 February 2020, as part of the Mount Lemmon Survey or Catalina Sky Survey. The asteroid's discovery was announced by the Minor Planet Center on 25 February 2020, after subsequent observations confirmed that it was orbiting Earth.

It is the second temporary satellite of Earth discovered in situ, after , which was discovered in 2006. Based on its nominal trajectory,  was captured by Earth around 2016–2017, and escaped Earth's gravitational sphere of influence around 7 May 2020.  will make another close pass to Earth in March 2044, though it will most likely not be captured by Earth due to the greater approach distance.

 has an absolute magnitude around 32, indicating that it is very small in size.

Discovery 

 was discovered on 15 February 2020, by astronomers Theodore Pruyne and Kacper Wierzchoś at the Mount Lemmon Observatory. The observed orbital motion of the object suggested that it may be gravitationally bound to Earth, which prompted further observations to secure and determine its motion.

The object's discovery was reported to the Minor Planet Center's Near-Earth Object Confirmation Page (NEOCP), where a preliminary orbit was calculated from additional observations conducted at several observatories. Follow-up observations of  spanned six days since its discovery, and the object was formally announced in a Minor Planet Electronic Circular notice issued by the Minor Planet Center on 25 February 2020. No indication of perturbations by solar radiation pressure was observed, and  could not be linked to any known artificial object. Although the evidence implied that  is most likely a dense, rocky asteroid, the possibility of the object being an artificial object, such as a dead satellite or rocket booster, had not yet been fully ruled out.

Precovery images of  have been identified back to May 2018.

Nomenclature 
Upon discovery, the asteroid was given the temporary internal designation C26FED2. After follow up observations confirming the object, it was then given the provisional designation  by the Minor Planet Center on 25 February 2020. The provisional designation signifies the object's discovery date and year. The object has not yet been issued a permanent minor planet number by the Minor Planet Center due to its modest observation arc of a couple years and that it has not been observed at enough oppositions.

Orbit 

Temporary capture 

Because  has an Earth-like heliocentric orbit, its motion relative to Earth is low, allowing for it to slowly approach the planet and get captured. Nominal orbit solutions for  suggest that it was captured by Earth between 2016–2017, and left geocentric orbit by May 2020 according to simulations of its orbit. The Moon gravitationally perturbs 's geocentric orbit, causing it to be unstable.

's orbit around Earth is highly variable and eccentric, hence predictions of its past trajectory before mid-2017 are uncertain. Due to the Yarkovsky effect on small asteroids, the first precovery image being from 2018, and numerous approaches to the Earth and Moon, it is unknown if the asteroid was closer than the Moon on Christmas Day 2015.

According to the JPL Small-Body Database, on 15 September 2017 it passed  from the Moon.

Being captured into a temporary orbit around Earth,  is a temporarily captured object or a temporary satellite of Earth.  has also been widely referred to in the media as a "mini-moon" of Earth, due to its small size.  is the second known temporary captured object discovered in situ around Earth, with the first being  discovered in 2006. Other objects have also been suspected to have once been temporarily captured, including the small near-Earth asteroid 1991 VG and the bolide DN160822 03.

Future approaches 
It is unlikely that  will be captured by Earth in the March 2044 encounter, as the approach distance is too large for capture and outside of Earth's hill sphere. After the 2061 encounter the uncertainties in future encounters become much greater. By 2082 close approaches have a 3-sigma uncertainty of 

The possibility of  impacting Earth has been considered by the Jet Propulsion Laboratory's Sentry risk table. JPL's solution accounts for non-gravitational forces as the multi-decade motion of a very small object is greatly affected by solar heating. Being only a few meters in size, an impact by  would pose no threat to Earth as it would most likely fragment and disintegrate upon atmospheric entry. JPL Horizon's nominal orbit has the asteroid passing  from Earth on 8 October 2082 (29 days after the virtual impactor).

Physical characteristics 

 is estimated to have an absolute magnitude (H) around 31.7, indicating that it is very small in size. The rotation period and albedo of  have not been measured due to the limited number of observations.

See also 
  – near-Earth asteroid temporarily captured by Earth after its discovery in 1991
  – the first temporary Earth satellite discovered in situ 2006
  another temporary Earth satellite discovered in 2022
 Claimed moons of Earth
 Quasi-satellite

Notes

References

External links 

 Earth Has A Mini-Moon — But Not for Long! by Bob King, Sky & Telescope, 2 March 2020
 A New Mini-Moon Was Found Orbiting Earth. There Will Be More. by Rebecca Boyle, The New York Times, 27 Feb 2020
 Gemini Telescope Images "Minimoon" Orbiting Earth — in Color! , OIR Laboratory press release, 27 Feb 2020
 Looks like Earth has a new natural moon by Deborah Byrd, EarthSky, 26 Feb 2020
 MPEC 2020-D104 : 2020 CD3: Temporarily Captured Object, Minor Planet Center announcement, 25 Feb 2020
 
 

Minor planet object articles (unnumbered)
20200215
20200215

Claimed moons of Earth
Potential impact events caused by near-Earth objects